Basilio Repilado (4 March 1944 in Havana – 4 December 2013 in Havana) was a Cuban musician. He is mainly notable as one of the five sons of Compay Segundo, seeking to expand on and promote his father's musical legacy. He joined his father's band, Compay Segundo y Sus Muchachos, in 1999 as a backing vocalist and percussionist. On Compay Segundo's Duets album they recorded together a version of "Linda Graciela" that Billboard, counted "an exercise in understated beauty and excellent ensemble work" and one of the highlights of the album. He is also known in Havana as an intense Beatles fan, promoting Beatles tributes.

Discography
 Fibras del alma (2007)

References

External links
 The sons Compay Segundo, Basilio and Salvador, with the minister of culture, Abel Prieto. El País.

Cuban musicians
1944 births
2012 deaths
Son cubano musicians
People from Havana